Joseph Francis Biroc,  (February 12, 1903 – September 7, 1996) was an American cinematographer. He was born in New York City and began working in films at the Paragon Studios in Fort Lee, New Jersey. After working there for approximately six years, he moved to Los Angeles. Once in Southern California, Biroc worked at the RKO Pictures movie studio. During World War II, he served in the U.S. Army Signal Corps, and filmed the Liberation of Paris in August 1944. In 1950, Biroc left RKO Pictures and freelanced on projects at various studios. In addition to his film work, which included It's a Wonderful Life (1946) and The Flight of the Phoenix (1965), Biroc worked on various television series, including the Adventures of Superman and Wonder Woman. He frequently collaborated with film director Robert Aldrich.

Biroc won the Academy Award for Best Cinematography for The Towering Inferno (1974), which he shared with Fred J. Koenekamp, and two Primetime Emmy Awards.

Early life and education 
Joseph Francis Biroc was born on February 12, 1903, in New York City, New York. He attended Emerson High School in Union City, New Jersey only to drop out to pursue a career in film – a subject he'd been passionate about since childhood. He saw his “first movie in 1910 on a vacant lot five blocks from his home” and knew from then he wanted to spend the rest of his life making movies.

Career 
At the age of fifteen, with his uncle's help, Biroc began his career in film as a film lab technician with Paragon Labs in Fort Lee, New Jersey in 1918. The apprenticeship marked the beginning of a series of jobs at numerous laboratories for Biroc – which was then a required step for aspiring cinematographers.

Two years later, he started working at Craftsman Labs in New York from 1920 to 1923 and shortly for Goldwyn Pictures in Culver City, California in 1923. After his time at Goldwyn Pictures, Biroc returned to New York and took a job as film printer for Famous Players-Lasky, where he was shortly after promoted to assistant cameraman. After Famous Players-Lasky shut down in 1927, Biroc moved to Los Angeles to work for United Artists prior to moving to RKO to work as a camera operator. Biroc started at RKO by serving as assistant to cinematographers Leo Tover, Robert De Grasse, and Edward Cronjager. During his time at RKO, Biroc worked on Cimarron (1931), Swing Time (1936), and Shall We Dance (1937). He also worked on A Woman Rebels (1936), Sylvia Scarlett (1935), and Five Came Back (1939) (among others), but received no screen credit as RKO hardly credited camera operators. His last work before World War II was for Bombardier (1943).

In 1943, Biroc began his career as a motion picture cameraman in the Army Signal Corps. Two years later, he filmed the brutalities at the Dachau concentration camp in Germany while serving as captain of the sixth detachment alongside George Stevens's Special Motion Picture Coverage Unit. The end of the war marked a significant period in Biroc's life as he achieved the rank of captain and eventually, the rank of major. He also obtained his first credit as cinematographer for It's A Wonderful Life (1946). Following this, Biroc “served as cinematographer for the first 3-D American feature length film in color” titled Bwana Devil (1952).

In 1952, Biroc began his association with producer-director Robert Aldrich, starting with shooting an episode of The Doctor and moving onto films such as Attack (1956), World for Ransom (1954), Hush...Hush, Sweet Charlotte for which Biroc received his first Oscar nomination, The Flight of the Phoenix (1965), and The Longest Yard (1974). Biroc also “shot film for network television early on, such as musical shorts featuring Duke Ellington, Nat King Cole, and Louis Armstrong"– a feat considered rare for cameramen during the time period. During the majority of the 1950s, Biroc focused on television – both black and white and color. Biroc concluded his career in the 1970s and 1980s with work on television movies, specials, and miniseries.

Legacy

It's A Wonderful Life (1946) 
Biroc worked alongside four-time Oscar nominated cinematographer Joseph Walker in filming It's A Wonderful Life (1946) and achieved his first on-screen credit for his contribution.

Bwana Devil (1952) 
Biroc was the cinematographer for the first feature-length 3-D color film in history, Bwana Devil (1952). He writes in an article for the American Cinematographer, “while other 3-D systems have employed dual cameras, none have pursued the theory that the 3-D cameras should see and record the scene exactly as the human eyes see it.” (336, August 1952). He goes on to explain how Natural Vision, the corporation he worked with, provided a different experience with 3-D pictures as it induced no eye strain.

Washington: Behind Closed Doors (1977) 
Biroc wrote an article for American Cinematographer where he explained the process behind filming the series Washington: Behind Closed Doors (1977). In the article he mentions how the producers of the movie wanted the sets to look like actual locations, so each set had to have a big ceiling on it. He also mentions how he achieved a widespread shot for a scene – “we used a hospital chair as a dolly…we put a board across the handles of the wheelchair and the camera operator sat on the board.”

Hammett (1982) 
Biroc worked with director Wim Wenders and producers Fred Roos, Ronald Colby, and Don Guest to achieve a classic lighting look for Hammett (1982). He stated in an interview with Richard Patterson for American Cinematographer, “Actually the way I photograph is the way they photographed 40, 50, 60, 80 years ago. It's just basic lighting and basic photography.”

Personal life 
Biroc “was survived by one sister, Agnes Kronmeyer [who passed away in 2017] of Cranford, NJ, and four grandchildren.”

Filmography

Film

Television

Television films 

Refs:

Awards and nominations

 Academy Award for Best Cinematography (Black & White) nomination (1964; b&w) for Hush...Hush, Sweet Charlotte
Emmy Award (1972) for Brian's Song
Primetime Emmy Award for Outstanding Achievement in Cinematography - ABC Movie of the Week (1972)
Academy Award for Best Cinematography won (1974; shared) for The Towering Inferno
Emmy Award nomination (1977) for The Moneychangers [Part 1]
Emmy Award nomination (1978) for Washington: Behind Closed Doors [Part 1] & A Family Upside Down
Emmy Award nomination (1979) for Little Women [Part 2]
Emmy Award nomination (1980) for Kenny Rogers as the Gambler
Emmy Award (1983) for Casablanca [episode The Master Builder's Woman]
Emmy Award nomination (1985) for A Death in California 
ASC Lifetime Achievement Award (1988)

Refs:

Bibliography and further reading 
 "Hollywood Launches 3-D Production," in American Cinematographer(Hollywood), August 1952.
 "Photographing Washington: Behind Closed Doors," in American Cinematographer(Hollywood), November 1977.
 American Cinematographer(Hollywood), July 1981.
 Focus on Film(London), no. 13, 1973.
 Patterson, R., on Hammettin American Cinematographer(Hollywood), November 1982.
 Basinger, Jeanine, in TheIt's a Wonderful Life Book, 1987.
 American Cinematographer(Hollywood), March 1989.
 Obituary, in American Cinematographer(Hollywood), November 1996.
 Obituary, in Cinefantastique(Forest Park), vol. 28, no. 6, 1996.

References

External links 
 Joseph Biroc at the Internet Movie Database
 Joseph Biroc papers, Margaret Herrick Library, Academy of Motion Picture Arts and Sciences
 Biography/film work

1903 births
1996 deaths
American war correspondents
Artists from New York City
American cinematographers
United States Army personnel of World War II
Best Cinematographer Academy Award winners
United States Army soldiers